Bulayevo (Bulaev) is a town and the administrative center of Magzhan Zhumabaev District in North Kazakhstan Region of Kazakhstan. Population:

References

Populated places in North Kazakhstan Region